Vuyisanani Mangisa (born 14 August 1987) is a South African field hockey player who competed in the 2008 Summer Olympics, 2010 Commonwealth Games and the 2014 Women's Hockey World Cup.

References

External links

1987 births
Living people
South African female field hockey players
Female field hockey goalkeepers
Olympic field hockey players of South Africa
Field hockey players at the 2008 Summer Olympics
Field hockey players at the 2010 Commonwealth Games
Commonwealth Games competitors for South Africa
21st-century South African women